The 1988–89 Segunda Divisão season was the 55th season of recognised second-tier football in Portugal. It started on 6 September 1988 and ended on 15 May 1989.

Overview
The league was contested by 54 teams in 3 divisions with União da Madeira, Feirense and Tirsense winning the respective divisional competitions and gaining promotion to the Primeira Liga.  The overall championship was won by União da Madeira.

League standings

Segunda Divisão - Zona Norte

Segunda Divisão - Zona Centro

Segunda Divisão - Zona Sul

Play-offs

Championship play-off

Footnotes

External links
 Portuguese Division Two «B» - footballzz.co.uk

Portuguese Second Division seasons
Port
2